Hilarocassis is a genus of tortoise beetles and hispines in the family Chrysomelidae. There are about 10 described species in Hilarocassis.

Species
These 10 species belong to the genus Hilarocassis:
 Hilarocassis albida (Germar, 1824)
 Hilarocassis bordoni Borowiec, 2002
 Hilarocassis evanida (Boheman, 1850)
 Hilarocassis exclamationis (Linnaeus, 1767)
 Hilarocassis maculicollis Swietojanska, 2003
 Hilarocassis nigritarsis (Boheman, 1854)
 Hilarocassis quinquelineata Spaeth, 1913
 Hilarocassis rubripennis (Spaeth, 1922)
 Hilarocassis suturella (Boheman, 1850)
 Hilarocassis venusta (Boheman, 1854)

References

Further reading

 
 
 
 

Cassidinae
Articles created by Qbugbot